The Football League 2007–08 (named Coca-Cola Football League for sponsorship reasons), was the sixteenth season under its current league division format. It began in August 2007 and concluded in May 2008, with the promotion play-off finals.

The Football League is contested through three Divisions. The third and final division of these is League Two. The winner and the runner up of League Two will be automatically promoted to the Football League One and they will be joined by the winner of the League Two playoff. The bottom four teams in the league will be relegated to the Conference.

Dagenham & Redbridge and Morecambe played at this level for the first time.

Changes from last season

From League Two
Promoted to League One
 Walsall
 Hartlepool United
 Swindon Town
 Bristol Rovers

Relegated to Conference
 Boston United
 Torquay United

To League Two
Relegated from League One
 Chesterfield
 Bradford City
 Rotherham United
 Brentford

Promoted from Conference
 Dagenham & Redbridge
 Morecambe

League table

Play-offs

Results

Top scorers

Managers

Stadia and locations

Managerial changes

References 

 
EFL League Two seasons
3
4
Eng